Takeo Kamachi (20 March 1936 – 4 December 2014) was a Japanese sports shooter and Olympic champion, born in Manchukuo. He won a gold medal in the 25 metre rapid fire pistol at the 1984 Summer Olympics in Los Angeles.

References

1936 births
2014 deaths
People from Northeast China
Japanese male sport shooters
Shooters at the 1968 Summer Olympics
Shooters at the 1972 Summer Olympics
Shooters at the 1976 Summer Olympics
Shooters at the 1984 Summer Olympics
Olympic shooters of Japan
Olympic gold medalists for Japan
Olympic medalists in shooting
Asian Games medalists in shooting
Shooters at the 1966 Asian Games
Shooters at the 1970 Asian Games
Shooters at the 1974 Asian Games
Shooters at the 1978 Asian Games
Japan Ground Self-Defense Force personnel
Medalists at the 1984 Summer Olympics
Asian Games gold medalists for Japan
Asian Games bronze medalists for Japan
Medalists at the 1966 Asian Games
Medalists at the 1970 Asian Games
Medalists at the 1974 Asian Games
Medalists at the 1978 Asian Games
20th-century Japanese people